The 2020 Toppserien was the 34th season of the highest women's football league in Norway. The season was to start initially on 21 March 2020 but due to the effects of the COVID-19 pandemic, it was delayed. It finally commenced on 3 July 2020 and ended on 6 December 2020. This season featured just 10 teams.

Vålerenga won their first Toppserien title on goal difference after finishing second the previous season.

Format
The league consisted of 10 teams this season, which played each other twice (home and away) totalling 18 matches for a team.

Teams

Teams information

League table

Results

Matches

Positions by round

Relegation play-offs
The league's ninth placed team, Kolbotn, faced Medkila, the 2020 1. divisjon runners-up, in a two-legged play-off to decide who will play in the 2021 Toppserien.

1st leg

Note- This match was played before the final round of matches as Kolbotn had played theirs a week earlier.

2nd leg

Kolbotn won 6–2 on aggregate and both teams remained in their respective leagues.

Season statistics

Top scorers
Updated to matches played on 6 December 2020

Disciplinary

Players
Updated to matches played on 6 December 2020

Points classification: Yellow card - 1 point, Red card - 3 points.

Club
Updated to matches played on 6 December 2020

Points classification: Yellow card - 1 point, Red card - 3 points

Awards

References

External links
Official website
2020 Toppserien at Soccerway.com
2020 Toppserien at Worldfootball.net

Toppserien seasons
Top level Norwegian women's football league seasons
1
Norway
Norway
Toppserien